Aleksandr Buchenkov (born 21 December 1963) is a Soviet swimmer. He competed in the men's 200 metre butterfly at the 1980 Summer Olympics.

References

1963 births
Living people
Soviet male swimmers
Olympic swimmers of the Soviet Union
Swimmers at the 1980 Summer Olympics
Place of birth missing (living people)
Male butterfly swimmers